The Braekel or Brakel is a traditional Belgian breed of chicken. It is thought to have originated in the area of Brakel, in the Flemish province of East Flanders, for which it is named. There is a bantam version of the Braekel. The Campine of the United Kingdom derives from it.

History 

The Braekel apparently derives from same extended population of gold and silver chickens which gave rise to the closely similar Ostfriesische Möwe and Westfälischer Totleger breeds. It is thought to have originated in the area of Brakel, in the Flemish province of East Flanders, and particularly in the villages of Opbrakel and Nederbrakel; and to have spread along the valleys of the Scheldt and Dender rivers, in East Flanders and into Hainaut.

In 1884 two distinct types were recognised as separate breeds: the larger Braekel of Flanders, and a smaller and lighter type from the Campine region to the east. In 1898 a Braekel breeders' society was established in Nederbrakel, and a breed standard was published. In 1926 the separate Braekel and Campine breeds were brought together again under a single breed standard.

In the United Kingdom a very different Campine breed was created, probably through cross-breeding with pencilled Hamburgs. The principal difference is that cock birds display hen-feathering, which was not seen in the Belgian type. 

The Braekel population declined during and after the Second World War and it is a rare breed.

Characteristics 

A straight banding pattern of the feathers and a uniform solid neck colour are characteristic of the Braekel. Several colour variants exist, with the gold and the silver variant being the most common.

Use 

Braekel hens lay well from the age of six or seven months, and in a year may produce approximately 180 white-shelled eggs weighing

References 


Chicken breeds originating in Belgium
Chicken breeds
Animal breeds on the GEH Red List